"Sink or Swim" is the debut release and first single by Bad Lieutenant. It appears as the first track on their debut album Never Cry Another Tear. It was released on 28 September 2009. The single was backed with the fellow album track "Dynamo". The single did not chart in the UK, though sales were likely impacted as both songs had already been released for free through the band's websites prior to the official release that September. In February 2010, to accompany the band's first UK tour, a digital remix bundle was released with remixes by Mark Reeder, James Bright and The Teenagers.

Track listing

Release History
7" Vinyl
7" Vinyl limited (bundled with deluxe versions of Never Cry Another Tear)
Digital Download
Digital Remix Bundle

Personnel
Musicians
 Phil Cunningham - Guitar, Keyboards, Bass
 Jake Evans - Guitar, Backing Vocals, Keyboards, Bass
 Bernard Sumner - Vocals, Guitar, Keyboards, Bass
 Jack Mitchell - Drums ("Sink or Swim")
 Matt Evans - Drums ("Dynamo"), Backing Vocals

Technical
 Bernard Sumner and Bad Lieutenant - Production
 Chris Taylor - Additional Engineering ("Dynamo")
 Stephen Marsh - Additional Engineering ("Dynamo")
 Justin Richards - Additional Engineering ("Sink or Swim")
 Danny Davies - Mixing
 Frank Arkwright - Mastering
 Danny Davies - Recording
 Andrew Robinson and Jake Evans - Additional Recording

References

2009 debut singles
Songs written by Bernard Sumner
Songs written by Phil Cunningham (rock musician)
2009 songs